The speaker of the New York State Assembly is the highest official in the New York State Assembly, customarily elected from the ranks of the majority party.

As in most countries with a British heritage, the speaker presides over the lower house of the legislature. The position exists in every U.S. state and in the United States House of Representatives, the lower house of the Congress. New York's Assembly Speaker is very powerful. Effectively, the Speaker of the New York Assembly has the power to control much of the business in the Assembly and, in fact, throughout all of state government. Through almost single-handed control of the chamber, the Assembly Speaker is able to dictate what legislation makes and does not make it to the floor.

Selection 

The Assembly elects its speaker at the beginning of a new term following the state elections, or after a vacancy in the office has occurred. The Clerk of the Assembly from the previous year will convene the Assembly and preside over the election process. Traditionally, each party caucus nominates a member from among their senior leadership. To be elected speaker a member must receive a majority of votes cast.

List of speakers

Note
Originally, the legislative term lasted one year, from July 1 until June 30 of the next year. The members were elected at the state election in April, but the actual session began ordinarily only in January of the next calendar year, which leads occasionally to some confusion. Only if the governor called for a special session is the Assembly convened earlier. For example, in presidential election years the Assembly convened already in November to elect the presidential electors. The speaker was always elected at the first meeting of the Assembly for the remainder of the term, expiring on June 30.

The State Constitution of 1821 moved the election to November, and the beginning of the term to January 1, and from 1823 on, the legislative term coincides with the calendar year. The assembly convened usually on the first Tuesday in January and elected the speaker, who stayed in office until December 31.

An amendment to the State Constitution, adopted in November 1937, extended the assemblymen's term to two years, beginning with the electees of November 1938 who served the first two-year term in 1939–40. The elections are held in even-numbered years.

From 1777 to 1822
(1st Session, convened at Kingston and Poughkeepsie) September 10, 1777 – June 30, 1778 Walter Livingston from Albany County 
(2nd S., at Poughkeepsie) October 13, 1778 – June 30, 1779 Walter Livingston from Albany County
(3rd S., at Kingston and Albany) August 18, 1779 – July 2, 1780 Evert Bancker from New York County
(4th S., at Poughkeepsie and Albany) September 7, 1780 – July 1, 1781 Evert Bancker from New York County
(5th S., at Poughkeepsie) October 24, 1781 – June 30, 1782 Evert Bancker from New York County
(6th S., at Poughkeepsie and Kingston) July 11, 1782 – June 30, 1783 Evert Bancker from New York County
(7th S.) January 21 – June 30, 1784 John Hathorn from Orange County
(8th S., at New York City) October 12, 1784 – June 30, 1785 David Gelston from Suffolk County 
(9th S., at New York City) January 12 – June 30, 1786 John Lansing, Jr. from Albany County
(10th S., at New York City) January 12 – June 30, 1787 Richard Varick from New York County
(11th S., at Poughkeepsie) January 9 – June 30, 1788 Richard Varick from New York County
(12th S., at Albany) December 11, 1788 – June 30, 1789 John Lansing, Jr. from Albany County
(13th S., at Albany and New York City) July 6, 1789 – June 30, 1790 Gulian Verplanck (Fed.) from New York County
(14th S., at New York City) January 5 – June 30, 1791 John Watts from New York County
(15th S., at New York City) January 4 – June 30, 1792 John Watts from New York County
(16th S., at New York City) November 6, 1792 – June 30, 1793 John Watts from New York County
(17th S., at Albany) January 7 – June 30, 1794 James Watson, (Fed.) from New York County
(18th S., at Poughkeepsie and New York City) January 6 – June 30, 1795 William North (Fed.) of Albany County
(19th S., at New York City) January 6 – June 30, 1796 William North (Fed.) of Albany County
(20th S., at New York City and Albany) November 1, 1796 – June 30, 1797 Gulian Verplanck (Fed.) from New York 
(21st S.) January 2 – June 30, 1798 Dirck Ten Broeck (Fed.) of Albany County
(22nd S.) August 9, 1798 – June 30, 1799 Dirck Ten Broeck (Fed.) of Albany County
(23rd S.) January 28 – June 30, 1800 Dirck Ten Broeck (Fed.) of Albany County
(24th S.) November 4, 1800 – June 30, 1801 Samuel Osgood, from New York County
(25th S.) January 26 – June 30, 1802 Thomas Storm from New York County
(26th S.) January 25 – June 30, 1803 Thomas Storm from New York County
(27th S.) January 31 – June 30, 1804 Alexander Sheldon from Montgomery County
(28th S.) November 6, 1804 – June 30, 1805 Alexander Sheldon from Montgomery County
(29th S.) January 28 – June 30, 1806 Alexander Sheldon (Clintonian) from Montgomery County
(30th S.) January 27 – June 30, 1807 Andrew McCord (Lewisite) from Orange County
(31st S.) January 26 – June 30, 1808 Alexander Sheldon from Montgomery County
(32nd S.) November 1, 1808 – June 30, 1809 James W. Wilkin from Orange County
(33rd S.) January 30 – June 30, 1810 William North from Schenectady County
(34th S., part) January 29 – February 12, 1811 Nathan Sanford from New York County (failed to attend session because of illness)
(34th S., part) February 12 – June 30, 1811 William Ross (Dem.-Rep.) from Orange County
(35th S.) January 28 – June 30, 1812 Alexander Sheldon, from Montgomery County
(36th S.) November 3, 1812 – June 30, 1813 Jacob R. Van Rensselaer (Fed.), from Columbia County
(37th S.) January 25 – June 30, 1814 James Emott (Fed.) from Dutchess County
(38th S.) September 26, 1814 – June 30, 1815 Samuel Young from Saratoga County
(39th S.) January 31 – June 30, 1816 Daniel Cruger from Steuben County 
(40th S.) November 5, 1816 – June 30, 1817 David Woods from Washington County
(41st S.) January 27 – June 30, 1818 David Woods from Madison County
(42nd S.) January 6 – June 30, 1819 Obadiah German from Chenango County 
(43rd S.) January 4 – June 30, 1820 John Canfield Spencer (Dem.-Rep./Clintonian) from Ontario County
(44th S.) November 7, 1820 – June 30, 1821 Peter Sharpe (Dem.-Rep./Tammany Hall) from New York County
(45th S.) January 3 – December 31, 1822 Samuel B. Romaine (Dem.-Rep./Tammany Hall) from New York County (The assemblymen of this session were elected in April 1821 under the provisions of the State Constitution of 1777 for a term beginning on July 1, 1821, and expiring on June 30, 1822. The State Constitution of 1821, ratified by the voters in February 1822, provided for their remaining in office until December 31, 1822, although the Assembly did not meet again after the usual adjournment in May. The next session's members were elected in November 1822 for a term beginning on January 1, 1823.)

Since 1823
Speakers since 1823 are:

Notes

 
Speakers
New York